The WPGA Championship of Europe was a women's professional golf tournament on the Ladies European Tour.

The tournament was first played in 1979 in France, the first WPGA event held outside the United Kingdom. It was revived 1996 at Gleneagles in Scotland, titled the McDonald's WPGA Championship, and was the first event on the tour to be played solely for charity. Following the withdrawal of McDonald's as sponsors after just four years, there was a one-year break before the tournament returned to the tour in 2001 with a new home in Wales. It was last played in 2010.

Winners

References

External links
Official Ladies European Tour Website

Former Ladies European Tour events
Golf tournaments in Wales
Golf tournaments in Scotland
Defunct golf tournaments in France
Defunct golf tournaments
Annual sporting events in the United Kingdom
Recurring sporting events established in 1979
Recurring sporting events disestablished in 2010
1996 establishments in Scotland
2010 disestablishments in Wales